Waynesboro is a borough in Franklin County, Pennsylvania, United States. Located on the southern border of the state, Waynesboro is in the Cumberland Valley between Hagerstown, Maryland, and Chambersburg, Pennsylvania.  It is part of Chambersburg, PA Micropolitan Statistical Area, which is part of the Washington–Baltimore metropolitan area. It is two miles north of the Mason–Dixon line and close to Camp David and the Raven Rock Mountain Complex.

The population within the borough limits was 10,951 at the 2020 census. When combined with the surrounding Washington and Quincy Townships, the population of greater Waynesboro is 31,166.  The Waynesboro Area School District serves a resident population of 32,386, according to 2010 federal census data.

History

The region around Antietam Creek had been home to Native Americans for thousands of years prior to settlement by Anglo-Europeans in the mid-18th century. Beginning in 1751, a certain John Wallace obtained several warrants for the land on which the center of the town now stands. In 1797, John Wallace, a son of the original Scottish settler, laid out the town of Waynesburg in Franklin (formerly Cumberland) County, Pennsylvania (USA). When incorporated in 1831, the borough was given the name "Waynesboro".  It is one of several dozen towns, cities, and counties named after General Anthony Wayne, a hero of the American Revolution.

During the Civil War, Waynesboro played a part in the Gettysburg campaign in June and July 1863. In the week before the Battle of Gettysburg, Confederate Major General Jubal Early's division of Lieutenant General Richard S. Ewell's corps of the Army of Northern Virginia passed through the community on its way northward. After the battle, General Robert E. Lee rode through the border community with his retreating forces.

Numerous stone grain mills are in the area: Welty's Mill, Shank's Mill, Hopewell Roller Mill and others. Most of them still standing and in use.

By the early years of the 20th century, Waynesboro had become an industrial town. It was known for the manufacture of engines, boilers, grinders, threshers, boring machines, bolt cutters, wood and iron workers' vises, nut facers, etc. There were also foundries and machine shops and manufacturers of lumber products. Local companies included Frick Company, Geiser Manufacturing, Waynesboro Knitting Mill, Connie's Sportwear, Freeman's Shoes, Landis Machine Company, and Landis Tool Company. In 1900, 5,396 people lived in the town; in 1910, 7,199 people; and in 1940, 10,231 people (notably more than in the year 2000 census).

Amenities
Waynesboro is home to Renfrew Museum and Park, a historical museum depicting 18th-century farm life. It is named after two young sisters who reputedly died there in 1764 during a Native American attack.

The Alexander Hamilton House, Borough Hall of the Borough of Waynesboro, Joseph J. Oller House, Royer–Nicodemus House and Farm, and Welty's Mill Bridge are listed on the National Register of Historic Places.

Camp Penn is located across from Old Forge State Park, nestled in the southern edge of the Michaux State Forest.

Geography
Waynesboro is located at 39°45'13" North, 77°34'55" West (39.753685, −77.581980).

Demographics

As of the census of 2010, there were 10,568 people, 4,512 households, and 2,740 families residing in the borough. The population density was 3,108.2 people per square mile (1,200.09/km2). There were 4,969 housing units at an average density of 1461.4 per square mile (564.2/km2). The racial makeup of the borough was 90.6% White, 2.9% African American, 0.3% Native American, 0.6% Asian, 0.0% Pacific Islander, 0.1% from other races, and 1.9% from two or more races. Hispanic or Latino of any race were 3.7% of the population.

There were 4,512 households, out of which 27.4% had children under the age of 18 living with them, 40.7% were married couples living together, 14.1% had a female householder with no husband present, and 39.3% were non-families. 32.7% of all households were made up of individuals, and 12.7% had someone living alone who was 65 years of age or older. The average household size was 2.33 and the average family size was 2.91.

In the borough, the population was spread out, with 23.4% under the age of 18, 9.8% from 18 to 24, 27.7% from 25 to 44, 24.2% from 45 to 64, and 15.1% who were 65 years of age or older. The median age was 36.6 years. For every 100 females there were 91.8 males. For every 100 females age 18 and over, there were 88.8 males.

The median income for a household in the borough was $41,155, and the median income for a family was $48,379. Males had a median income of $35,754 versus $30,872 for females. The per capita income for the borough was $21,749. About 7.0% of families and 10.3% of the population were below the poverty line, including 13.2% of those under age 18 and 8.4% of those age 65 or over.

Notable people
 Fred Bear, American bow hunter, bow manufacturer, author, and television host
 Max Bishop, second baseman from 1924 through 1935 for the Philadelphia Athletics
 John Goucher, Methodist pastor

See also
 Bloom Brothers Department Stores
 Anthony Wayne, Revolutionary War general
 Geiser Manufacturing, a leading Waynesboro manufacturer in its heyday

Notes

External links

 Greater Waynesboro Chamber of Commerce
 Mainstreet Waynesboro, Inc.
 Waynesboro Historical Society
 Borough of Waynesboro

 Waynesboro Area School District
 Antietam Historical Association

Populated places established in 1749
Boroughs in Franklin County, Pennsylvania
1831 establishments in Pennsylvania